Marin Draganja and Lovro Zovko won the title, defeating Alexandru-Daniel Carpen and Cristóbal Saavedra-Corvalán 6–4, 4–6, [11–9] in the final.

Seeds

Draw

Draw

References
 Main Draw

BRD Sibiu Challenger - Doubles
BRD Sibiu Challenger